The 2016 FIA Formula One World Championship was the 70th season of the Fédération Internationale de l'Automobile (FIA)'s Formula One motor racing. It featured the 67th Formula One World Championship, a motor racing championship for Formula One cars which is recognised by the sport's governing body, the FIA, as the highest class of competition for open-wheel racing cars. Teams and drivers took part in twenty-one Grands Prix—making for the longest season in the sport's history—starting in Australia on 20 March and finishing in Abu Dhabi on 27 November as they competed for the World Drivers' and World Constructors' championships.

The 2016 season saw the grid expand to twenty-two cars with the addition of the Haas F1 Team entry. Renault returned to the sport as a constructor after a four-year absence following their takeover of Lotus prior to the start of the season. The calendar similarly expanded, with the return of the German Grand Prix. The European Grand Prix was also revived, with the event visiting a new circuit in Azerbaijan's capital city, Baku.

Nico Rosberg won his only World Drivers' Championship title in the final race of the season. With nine wins and seven other podiums, Rosberg beat teammate and defending World Champion Lewis Hamilton by five points, ending Hamilton's 2 year dominance. Rosberg announced his retirement from the sport shortly after winning the title.

In the World Constructors' Championship, Mercedes successfully defended their title for the second consecutive year, beating Red Bull Racing by 297 points. Ferrari finished third overall, a further seventy points behind.

Teams and drivers
The following teams and drivers took part in the 2016 Formula One World Championship. All teams competed with tyres supplied by Pirelli.

This would be the final full season of Jenson Button's career. Button would participate in the 2017 Monaco Grand Prix, which would be the final race of his career. This would also be the final season of Esteban Gutiérrez's career as he would not be retained by Haas for 2017.

Free practice drivers 
Five drivers drove in free practice sessions in place of regular drivers.

Team changes

Several team changes took place before the season began. Haas F1 Team, a team formed by NASCAR Sprint Cup Series team owner Gene Haas, joined the Formula One grid, becoming the first American team to compete since the unrelated Haas Lola team competed in 1986. The team used power units supplied by Ferrari and a chassis developed by Dallara. Lotus's participation in the 2016 season was in question pending the resolution of a High Court case brought against the team by HM Revenue and Customs over unpaid PAYE tax.

Both Red Bull Racing and Scuderia Toro Rosso underwent changes regarding their power unit supply. The former formally ended their nine-year partnership with engine supplier Renault at the end of the 2015 season, with the team citing the lack of performance from the Renault Energy-F1 2015 engine as a leading factor in the change. The team continued using Renault engines, but they were rebadged as TAG Heuer. Team principal Christian Horner named Renault's partnership with Mario Illien and his company Ilmor as a reason for staying with the manufacturer. Meanwhile, Scuderia Toro Rosso returned to using Ferrari power units, as they had done prior to the start of 2014, after Renault announced that they would no longer supply customer engines. The team used the type 060 power unit used by Ferrari teams in 2015 after Ferrari received approval from the World Motor Sport Council to supply year-old engines.

Marussia applied for their team name to be changed to Manor Racing, a request granted in January 2016. The team adopted the formal name of "Manor Racing MRT" and switched from Ferrari to Mercedes power, with the team upgrading to a 2016-specification engine after having used a year-old Ferrari engine in 2015. The team underwent a management reshuffle following the resignation of team principal John Booth and sporting director Graeme Lowdon.

Sauber underwent a change in ownership in the week prior to the Hungarian Grand Prix, with the team being purchased by Longbow Finance. Despite the acquisition and the retirement of team founder Peter Sauber, the team continued to use the Sauber identity.

Driver changes

The driver line-ups saw a couple of changes prior to the 2016 season and three more while the season was underway. Romain Grosjean left Lotus at the end of the 2015 season. He signed with the newly formed Haas F1 Team for 2016, where he was joined by former Sauber driver Esteban Gutiérrez. Gutiérrez returned to competition after spending a season as Ferrari's test and reserve driver.

After having taken over the Lotus team, Renault introduced a new driver-line up. Jolyon Palmer, the 2014 GP2 Series champion, made his race debut in Melbourne. Palmer had previously made regular free practice appearances with the team when it was known as Lotus in 2015. Despite originally having signed a contract with Lotus for 2016, Pastor Maldonado announced he would not be driving for Renault after his sponsors were unable to fulfil their contractual obligations to the team. He was replaced by Kevin Magnussen, who was released by McLaren when they chose not to renew his contract after he entered a single race for the team in 2015.

Manor did not retain their 2015 drivers either, opting to sign two rookies for its 2016 campaign: reigning Deutsche Tourenwagen Masters champion Pascal Wehrlein and GP2 Series regular Rio Haryanto, who became the first Indonesian driver to race in the championship. Will Stevens and Roberto Merhi—who drove for the team when it competed as Marussia—were not retained by the team. Both moved to the FIA World Endurance Championship with Manor Motorsport, while Alexander Rossi, who also raced for the team in 2015, was moved to a test and reserve role while he joined the IndyCar Series.

Mid-season changes
McLaren reserve driver and reigning GP2 Series champion Stoffel Vandoorne made his Formula One debut, replacing Alonso. Alonso returned to his seat for the Chinese Grand Prix two weeks later. Daniil Kvyat and Max Verstappen traded places ahead of the Spanish Grand Prix, with Verstappen promoted to Red Bull Racing and Kvyat returning to Scuderia Toro Rosso. Red Bull explained the decision to swap their drivers as being made to relieve pressure on Kvyat following criticism for his role in a first-lap accident in the Russian Grand Prix, and to ease ongoing tension between Verstappen and teammate Carlos Sainz Jr. at Toro Rosso. He stayed with the team, filling a testing and reserve role. His race seat was filled by 2015 GP3 Series champion and Renault test driver Esteban Ocon, who made his Formula One debut with MRT at the Belgian Grand Prix.

Season calendar

The following twenty-one Grands Prix took place in 2016.

Calendar changes

There were a few revisions to the calendar from the previous season. The European Grand Prix returned to the calendar after a three-year absence. The race was moved from its previous home in Valencia to a brand-new street circuit in Baku, the capital of Azerbaijan. It was the first Grand Prix held in Azerbaijan. The German Grand Prix returned to the calendar as well, taking place at the Hockenheimring. The event had been cancelled in 2015 when a venue could not be secured. The circuit had previously hosted the race in 2014 as part of their agreement with the Nürburgring to alternate between venues, with the Hockenheimring hosting the race every even-numbered year.

The Malaysian and Russian Grands Prix were subjected to date changes. The former was paired up with the Japanese Grand Prix in October, reverting to the time of year it was held in 1999–2000, while the latter was brought forward from its October date to May, becoming the fourth round of the season.

Three races were contracted for 2016 but did not feature on the calendar. The Grand Prix of America was set to be held for the first time at the Port Imperial Street Circuit in New Jersey, in accordance with a fifteen-year contract. The Indian Grand Prix was removed from the calendar after the 2013 race, following a dispute over taxation. After several failed attempts at reviving the race in 2014 and 2015, the event's return was deferred until the 2016 season; however, it was once again left off the final calendar for the season. In 2006, Formula One Management had signed a seven-year contract to run the Korean Grand Prix at the Korea International Circuit beginning in 2010. However, the event was discontinued in 2014, and was omitted from the calendar for the third consecutive season in 2016.

Rule changes

General changes
The FIA and Formula One Management were granted greater power to change the Sporting and Technical regulations and to make decisions affecting the governance of the sport. From the Monaco race weekend onwards, the FIA allowed drivers to choose alternative helmet designs for one race weekend per season, a practice previously prohibited as drivers were required to wear the same design to make them more recognisable to spectators and television audiences.

Technical
Cars were required to be designed with a separate wastegate for exhaust gases to pass through in a bid to increase the noise of the cars following criticism since the introduction of the 2014 generation of engines. The FIA also opted to increase the number of tokens available for power unit development starting in 2016. While the initial plans would have given manufacturers fifteen tokens for the season, the number was raised to thirty-two, the same number as 2014, in order to allow struggling manufacturers such as Renault and Honda to improve their development. This decision also allowed further development on parts that were initially planned to be closed off, including the upper and lower crankcase, valve drive, crankshaft, air-valve system and ancillaries drive.

Sporting regulations

Schedule 
Starting in 2016, the number of pre-season tests were reduced from three to two. The FIA formally increased the maximum events allowed in a season from 20 to 21 to accommodate the calendar's approval.

Tyres 
Tyre supplier Pirelli introduced a fifth dry tyre compound known as "ultrasoft", with the manufacturer stating that they would only be available on street circuits. Pirelli further changed their approach to tyre supply in 2016, bringing three dry compounds to races instead of two. The compounds are made public two weeks before each event. Pirelli assigns two "choice" compounds, and a third set (the softest available regardless of Pirelli's selection) are given to teams reaching Q3. Drivers select their remaining ten tyre sets for the event between the three compounds and must use two dry compounds during the race.

Penalties 
The stewards were given greater powers in enforcing track limits, with drivers required to stay between the white lines marking the edges of the circuit, except in cases of driver error. Any driver who caused the start of a race to be aborted would have been required to start the race from pit lane at the restart. The procedure for issuing gearbox penalties was amended as well, so that penalties were applied in the order that they were awarded, bringing the system in line with the wider grid penalty system.

Safety improvements 
The usage of the Virtual Safety Car system was expanded to practice sessions as well to avoid the unnecessary use of red flags and session stoppages. The rules governing the use of the drag reduction system, which is deactivated when under Virtual Safety Car periods and full-course yellow flags, were also amended. Drivers were now allowed to make use of the device as soon as a Virtual Safety Car period has ended; while they previously had to wait two laps before the system was reactivated.

Qualifying 
The qualifying process was heavily revised two weeks before the season began. The three-period format first introduced in 2006 was retained, but with a progressive "knock-out" style of elimination. However, following widespread criticism of the format at the opening rounds, the format was abandoned after two races, and the system used between 2006 and 2015 re-introduced at the Chinese Grand Prix.

Other 
The stewards' powers to monitor pit-to-car communications were broadened for the 2016 season, with race control able to monitor the radio feeds for each driver in real time and consult with engineering advisors to further monitor the content in a bid to crack down on driver coaching and the use of coded messages. Following a series of controversial penalties at the British and Hungarian Grands Prix and extended debate over the application of the rules, however, the FIA relaxed the restrictions on radio-communication which were introduced at the start of the season; starting with the German Grand Prix, applying them to the formation lap only.

The process new drivers go through in order to qualify for a superlicence was changed as well, with additional restrictions—including the requirement that drivers complete eighty percent of two seasons from a series outside a recognised points-paying championship—put in place as part of the wider FIA Global Pathway. The new points system was retroactively applied, with all results for all eligible drivers automatically qualifying for superlicence points. The changes were introduced following the controversy which surrounded Max Verstappen qualifying for a superlicence at the age of sixteen after a single season competing in European Formula 3.

Season report

Pre-season

For the second year in a row, Hamilton decided not to exercise his option of switching his car number to 1, as was his prerogative as reigning World Champion, and would instead race with his career number 44. A pre-season tyre test was held at Circuit Paul Ricard in France in January, conducted by Pirelli to evaluate their wet weather tyres. The first pre-season team test was held a month later at the Circuit de Catalunya. Ferrari were fastest on three of the four testing days, with Nico Hülkenberg topping the time sheets for Force India on the third day. A second test, also in Barcelona, was conducted on 1–4 March. Ferrari ended the two tests with the best time set overall on the newly introduced ultra-soft tyres, while Mercedes covered the most distance in testing, almost . The second four days of testing also saw the teams examine a proposed feature for driver head protection, dubbed the "halo".

Opening rounds
The season started with the Australian Grand Prix, and featured the newly introduced elimination-style qualifying format. This format was heavily criticized by teams, drivers, fans and the press, which led to a review of the format before the next race. The race ended with a 1–2 finish for Mercedes with Nico Rosberg taking victory from Lewis Hamilton in second. Sebastian Vettel and Ferrari finished on the last remaining step of the podium. Teammate Kimi Räikkönen retired with a suspected turbo failure on lap 21. On lap 16, whilst attempting to overtake Esteban Gutiérrez in the new Haas F1 car at turn three, Fernando Alonso crashed at high speed into the outside barrier before barrel-rolling and landing upside-down against the barrier. Gutiérrez ended up in the gravel trap with terminal rear tyre damage, and quickly went over to Alonso who managed to exit his cockpit unaided. Due to the huge amount of debris caused by the accident the race was red flagged, with the cars subsequently lining up in the pitlane.

At the next race in Bahrain, Alonso was ruled out of taking part on medical grounds and was later revealed to have suffered broken ribs and a pneumothorax as a result of the previous race's collision, and was replaced by rookie Stoffel Vandoorne. Following the widespread criticism of the new qualifying format, the teams voted to abandon it and revert to the system used in 2015. However, in the week before the race weekend, the sport's Strategy Working Group over-ruled the teams in order to keep the elimination style for 2016. After qualifying, the system once again came under heavy fire with Hamilton securing pole position ahead of Rosberg and Vettel. The race saw Rosberg take his second consecutive victory of 2016 followed by Räikkönen and Hamilton, respectively. The Ferrari of Sebastian Vettel and the Renault of Jolyon Palmer retired before the race started with engine and hydraulics failures, respectively. Following a first-lap collision with Hamilton, Valtteri Bottas was penalised and given two points on his licence.

At the next Grand Prix in China, the elimination style qualifying format was permanently dropped in favour of the previous format used between 2006 and 2015. This yielded Nico Rosberg's first pole position of the year after Hamilton suffered a number of setbacks both in qualifying and during the race itself, eventually finishing in seventh place, with his teammate taking his third consecutive victory of the 2016 season. The race finished with no retirements, a feat that has only been achieved six times. The next race in Russia featured a number of incidents on the first lap with Vettel and Kvyat getting involved. Kvyat hit Vettel twice forcing him to retire. Rosberg won the race with his teammate Lewis Hamilton finishing second after starting 10th and Rosberg achieved his first grand slam and extended his championship lead going into the European races.

European rounds

Before the race in Spain, Daniil Kvyat and Max Verstappen swapped places with Kvyat going to Toro Rosso and Verstappen to Red Bull. The start of the race saw Hamilton and Rosberg collide, handing the lead to Daniel Ricciardo. The race also saw the youngest race winner as Max Verstappen won the Grand Prix, defending against Kimi Räikkönen after Red Bull committed Ricciardo to an additional pit stop.

At the next round in Monaco, Ricciardo took the first pole position of his career. Helped by the race starting behind the safety car he held the lead for 33 laps, but was unable to convert it to a win after his team made a costly error during his pit-stop. As a result, Lewis Hamilton inherited the lead and went on to win the race, his first of the season. Ricciardo finished second ahead of Sergio Pérez. Hamilton then went on to win the Canadian Grand Prix despite losing the lead to Sebastian Vettel at the start, reclaiming the position with a one-stop strategy while Vettel and Ferrari committed to two stops. Valtteri Bottas finished third, his first podium of the season. Rosberg won the returning European Grand Prix with his second grand slam of the season and of his career, ahead of Sebastian Vettel and Sergio Pérez, while Hamilton finished fifth after struggling with a software issue that limited his engine's ability to harvest energy.

Hamilton took pole position at the next round in Austria while Rosberg started sixth after a grid penalty. The two drivers followed opposing strategies to be first and second after the pit stops, with Hamilton on the preferred racing tyre gradually catching Rosberg. The two made contact as Hamilton tried to pass Rosberg on the final lap; Hamilton won the race, while Rosberg broke his front wing and finished fourth behind Verstappen and Räikkönen. A stewards' inquiry found that Rosberg had caused an avoidable collision, and handed him a ten-second penalty, though the race result was not affected. Hamilton reduced the deficit to Rosberg to a single point at the next round in Great Britain, where difficult conditions saw the drivers contend with a drying circuit and varying grip levels. Hamilton established an early lead, while Rosberg and Verstappen fought over second place. Rosberg prevailed, but suffered a critical fault with his gearbox late in the race. Mercedes instructed him to reset the gearbox and to avoid using seventh gear or else risk a catastrophic failure, which prompted an investigation by the stewards for providing him with assistance. Rosberg was ultimately penalised for the radio call, having ten seconds added to his race time, which demoted him to third behind Verstappen.

Lewis Hamilton took the championship lead from Nico Rosberg at the next round in Hungary, leading another Mercedes 1–2 finish to gain a six-point lead in the Drivers' Championship standings. The Grand Prix was marked by controversy: Rosberg secured pole position on a drying circuit in qualifying after McLaren's Fernando Alonso spun in front of him necessitating a double waved yellow flag. Although race stewards confirmed that Rosberg had slowed, he nevertheless secured pole with his lap time. The race saw Jenson Button fall afoul of new restrictions on pit-to-car communications that demanded that any car with an issue serious enough to require the intervention of the team be pitted or retired. Button reported a brake issue—which was later revealed to be a faulty sensor—and was penalised for unauthorised assistance.

Following penalties for Rosberg and Button for unauthorised pit-to-car communications in the previous races, the FIA repealed all regulations for the next round in Germany. Hamilton further consolidated his championship lead, beating Rosberg off the line at the start; for his part, Rosberg was caught by the Red Bulls of Daniel Ricciardo and Max Verstappen and was unable to pass them. Rosberg's race was further complicated by a time penalty for an aggressive pass on Verstappen that forced the Red Bull driver wide. However, Hamilton remained pessimistic about his position as championship leader, as with nine races left in the season, he was anticipating grid penalties for exceeding his engine allocation.

With Mercedes opting to take a series of grid penalties to build up a stockpile of components, Hamilton was forced to start the next race in Belgium from the back of the grid. He took advantage of first-lap contact between Vettel, Räikkönen and Verstappen to work his way through the field before a heavy accident involving Kevin Magnussen at Eau Rouge forced the race to be temporarily stopped. When the race resumed, Nico Rosberg led the race until the chequered flag, while Hamilton ultimately finished third after being unable to catch Daniel Ricciardo. Further down the order, Verstappen was subject to increasing criticism over his driving tactics after being caught in several incidents with Räikkönen and Sergio Pérez, while Esteban Ocon finished sixteenth on debut for MRT.

Rosberg reduced Hamilton's championship lead to two points at the next round in Italy, taking advantage of a slow start by Hamilton to establish an early lead that went unchallenged through the race. Hamilton dropped as low as fifth at the start, recovering to fourth in the opening laps and got ahead of the Ferraris of Vettel and Räikkönen by making one pit-stop less. Vettel went on to finish third—his first podium finish in five races—with Räikkönen fourth as the team introduced upgrades to the type 061 power unit in the hopes of recovering second place in the World Constructors' Championship from Red Bull.

Return to Asia

Rosberg reclaimed the championship lead in Singapore, qualifying on pole while Hamilton was forced to settle for third after struggling with mechanical issues and driving errors. A late pit stop during the race by Mercedes saw Hamilton pass Kimi Räikkönen for third which he held until the end of the race. Red Bull Racing decided to pit Daniel Ricciardo from second to prevent coming under threat from Hamilton. Rosberg decided to stay out because his lead over Ricciardo was not large enough to pit and stay ahead, but was able to hold on to first place to take the win. Ricciardo made late efforts to catch Rosberg from 27 seconds behind, but could not quite catch him, finishing 0.6 seconds behind at the chequered flag. With Hamilton finishing third, Rosberg turned a two-point deficit into an eight-point lead.

Mercedes's streak of ten consecutive wins came to an end in Malaysia. Hamilton established an early lead, but retired sixteen laps from the end of the race when his engine failed, leaving Daniel Ricciardo in control of the race. Nico Rosberg was turned around by Sebastian Vettel in a first corner accident that eliminated Vettel and forced Rosberg to work his way up through the field. Ricciardo raced Max Verstappen for the lead when Hamilton's retirement triggered a Virtual Safety Car, prompting Red Bull to pit both drivers at the same time. On fresher tyres, Ricciardo was able to withstand pressure from Verstappen to win his first race since the 2014 Belgian Grand Prix. Nico Rosberg finished third despite having ten seconds added to his race time for contact with Kimi Räikkönen, extending his championship lead to twenty-three points.

Rosberg further extended his championship lead to thirty-three points in Japan, starting the race from pole and winning it. Meanwhile, Hamilton suffered a poor start, slipping from second on the grid to eighth by the end of the first lap. He was forced to run a race of recovery, using pit strategy to reclaim third place going into the final phase of the race, but was unable to pass Max Verstappen, and finished third. The result secured Mercedes's third consecutive World Constructors' Championship title.

Championship conclusion
With the championship leaving Asia for the Americas, Hamilton gradually started to erode Rosberg's championship lead. Mercedes scored a 1–2 finish 
in the United States, with Rosberg taking advantage of a Virtual Safety Car triggered by Max Verstappen to take second place from Daniel Ricciardo. Hamilton led another Mercedes 1–2 in Mexico, with the race overshadowed by a late incident that saw Verstappen run wide and cut part of the circuit, triggering an angry radio message from Sebastian Vettel. Vettel inherited third place when Verstappen was penalised, only to be penalised himself for dangerous driving when defending against Ricciardo. The final amended results saw Ricciardo finish third, ahead of Verstappen and Vettel. Treacherous weather conditions saw the Brazilian Grand Prix subject to several race stoppages—most notably after Kimi Räikkönen crashed on the main straight—but when racing resumed, Mercedes took another 1–2 finish. Hamilton won the race ahead of Rosberg for the third time in as many races, with Max Verstappen completing the podium.

Going into the final round at Abu Dhabi, Rosberg led Hamilton by twelve points. That meant that if Hamilton won the race, Rosberg needed to finish third to win the championship. Hamilton secured pole ahead of Rosberg and led from the start. In the closing laps of the race, he slowed down in attempt to allow other drivers to catch and pass Rosberg, despite repeated instructions from Mercedes not to risk losing the race to Sebastian Vettel, who used pit strategy to bring himself into contention and was quickly catching up. Hamilton went on to win the race, while Rosberg secured his maiden Drivers' Championship title with second place.

Five days after winning the title, Rosberg announced his immediate retirement from the sport at the FIA Prize Giving Ceremony in Vienna.

Results and standings

Grands Prix

{|class="wikitable sortable" style="font-size: 85%;"
|-
! scope="col" | Round
! scope="col" | Grand Prix
! scope="col" | 
! scope="col" | 
! scope="col" | 
! scope="col" | 
! scope="col" class="unsortable"|
|-
! scope="row" | 1
| Australian Grand Prix
|data-sort-value="HAM"| Lewis Hamilton
|data-sort-value="RIC"| Daniel Ricciardo
|data-sort-value="ROS"| Nico Rosberg
|data-sort-value="MER"| Mercedes
|Report
|-
! scope="row" | 2
| Bahrain Grand Prix
|data-sort-value="HAM"| Lewis Hamilton
|data-sort-value="ROS"| Nico Rosberg
|data-sort-value="ROS"| Nico Rosberg
|data-sort-value="MER"| Mercedes
|Report
|-
! scope="row" | 3
| Chinese Grand Prix
|data-sort-value="ROS"| Nico Rosberg
|data-sort-value="HUL"|
|data-sort-value="ROS"| Nico Rosberg
|data-sort-value="MER"| Mercedes
|Report
|-
! scope="row" | 4
| Russian Grand Prix
|data-sort-value="ROS"| Nico Rosberg
|data-sort-value="ROS"| Nico Rosberg
|data-sort-value="ROS"| Nico Rosberg
|data-sort-value="MER"| Mercedes
|Report
|-
! scope="row" | 5
|data-sort-value="SPA"| Spanish Grand Prix
|data-sort-value="HAM"| Lewis Hamilton
|data-sort-value="KVY"| Daniil Kvyat
|data-sort-value="VER"|
|data-sort-value="RED"|
|Report
|-
! scope="row" | 6
|  Monaco Grand Prix
|data-sort-value="RIC"|
|data-sort-value="HAM"| Lewis Hamilton
|data-sort-value="HAM"| Lewis Hamilton
|data-sort-value="MER"| Mercedes
|Report
|-
! scope="row" | 7
| Canadian Grand Prix
|data-sort-value="HAM"| Lewis Hamilton
|data-sort-value="ROS"| Nico Rosberg
|data-sort-value="HAM"| Lewis Hamilton
|data-sort-value="MER"| Mercedes
|Report
|-
! scope="row" | 8
|data-sort-value="EUR"| European Grand Prix
|data-sort-value="ROS"| Nico Rosberg
|data-sort-value="ROS"| Nico Rosberg
|data-sort-value="ROS"| Nico Rosberg
|data-sort-value="MER"| Mercedes
|Report
|-
! scope="row" | 9
| Austrian Grand Prix
|data-sort-value="HAM"| Lewis Hamilton
|data-sort-value="HAM"| Lewis Hamilton
|data-sort-value="HAM"| Lewis Hamilton
|data-sort-value="MER"| Mercedes
|Report
|-
! scope="row" | 10
|data-sort-value="BRI"| British Grand Prix
|data-sort-value="HAM"| Lewis Hamilton
|data-sort-value="ROS"| Nico Rosberg
|data-sort-value="HAM"| Lewis Hamilton
|data-sort-value="MER"| Mercedes
|Report
|-
! scope="row" | 11
| Hungarian Grand Prix
|data-sort-value="ROS"| Nico Rosberg
|data-sort-value="RAI"| Kimi Räikkönen
|data-sort-value="HAM"| Lewis Hamilton
|data-sort-value="MER"| Mercedes
|Report
|-
! scope="row" | 12
|data-sort-value="GER"| German Grand Prix
|data-sort-value="ROS"| Nico Rosberg
|data-sort-value="RIC"| Daniel Ricciardo
|data-sort-value="HAM"| Lewis Hamilton
|data-sort-value="MER"| Mercedes
|Report
|-
! scope="row" | 13
| Belgian Grand Prix
|data-sort-value="ROS"| Nico Rosberg
|data-sort-value="HAM"| Lewis Hamilton
|data-sort-value="ROS"| Nico Rosberg
|data-sort-value="MER"| Mercedes
|Report
|-
! scope="row" | 14
| Italian Grand Prix
|data-sort-value="HAM"| Lewis Hamilton
|data-sort-value="ALO"|
|data-sort-value="ROS"| Nico Rosberg
|data-sort-value="MER"| Mercedes
|Report
|-
! scope="row" | 15
| Singapore Grand Prix
|data-sort-value="ROS"| Nico Rosberg
|data-sort-value="RIC"| Daniel Ricciardo
|data-sort-value="ROS"| Nico Rosberg
|data-sort-value="MER"| Mercedes
|Report
|-
! scope="row" | 16
| Malaysian Grand Prix
|data-sort-value="HAM"| Lewis Hamilton
|data-sort-value="ROS"| Nico Rosberg
|data-sort-value="RIC"|
|data-sort-value="RED"|
|Report
|-
! scope="row" | 17
| Japanese Grand Prix
|data-sort-value="ROS"| Nico Rosberg
|data-sort-value="VET"| Sebastian Vettel
|data-sort-value="ROS"| Nico Rosberg
|data-sort-value="MER"| Mercedes
|Report
|-
! scope="row" | 18
|
|data-sort-value="HAM"| Lewis Hamilton
|data-sort-value="VET"| Sebastian Vettel
|data-sort-value="HAM"| Lewis Hamilton
|data-sort-value="MER"| Mercedes
|Report
|-
! scope="row" | 19
| Mexican Grand Prix
|data-sort-value="HAM"| Lewis Hamilton
|data-sort-value="RIC"| Daniel Ricciardo
|data-sort-value="HAM"| Lewis Hamilton
|data-sort-value="MER"| Mercedes
|Report
|-
! scope="row" | 20
| Brazilian Grand Prix
|data-sort-value="HAM"| Lewis Hamilton
|data-sort-value="VER"| Max Verstappen
|data-sort-value="HAM"| Lewis Hamilton
|data-sort-value="MER"| Mercedes
|Report
|-
! scope="row" | 21
|data-sort-value="ABU"| Abu Dhabi Grand Prix
|data-sort-value="HAM"| Lewis Hamilton
|data-sort-value="VET"| Sebastian Vettel
|data-sort-value="HAM"| Lewis Hamilton
|data-sort-value="MER"| Mercedes
|Report
|-class="sortbottom"
|colspan="7" style="background-color:#EAECF0;text-align:center"|Sources:
|}

Scoring system

Points were awarded to the top ten classified finishers in every race, using the following structure:

In the event of a tie, a count-back system was used as a tie-breaker, with a driver's best result used to decide the standings.

World Drivers' Championship standingsNotes: † – Drivers did not finish the Grand Prix, but were classified as they completed more than 90% of the race distance.

World Constructors' Championship standings
In the event of a tie, a count-back system was used as a tie-breaker, with a constructor's best result used to decide the standings.Notes:'''
 † – Drivers did not finish the Grand Prix, but were classified as they completed more than 90% of the race distance.
 The standings are sorted by best result, rows are not related to the drivers. In case of tie on points, a certain position is achieved determines the outcome.

Footnotes

References

External links
 
 Fédération Internationale de l'Automobile

Formula One seasons
 
Formula 1